Compu-toon is a comic strip by Charles Boyce. 

Compu-toon was launched in 1994 through Tribune Media Services. At its height, the comic strip ran in about 150 newspapers worldwide from 1994 to 1997 in print form. Since April 23, 2001, it has appeared online via Ucomics/GoComics.

Format 
Compu-toon comics consist of a single panel and have a surrealist quality about them that has been described as "baffling and not exactly funny but the cartoonist seems too sincere about his mission to really mock". Strips usually contain a normal situation with a non sequitur that is tangentially related to computers or technology.

References

External links 
 

Comic strips syndicated by Tribune Content Agency
1994 comics debuts
1997 comics endings
Gag-a-day comics
Surreal comedy
2001 webcomic debuts
Comics characters introduced in 1994